The Dolam Plateau is the site of a 2017 standoff between China and India, and is the same as the Doklam triboundary area.

References

Bhutan–China relations
Bhutan–India relations
Bhutan–China border
China–India relations
Territorial disputes of China